Live at the Cellar Door is a live album by Neil Young, featuring performances from his six 1970 concerts in Washington D.C. It was released on December 10, 2013. The album is volume 02.5 in Young's Archives Performance Series. The album features songs from both Young's early albums and Buffalo Springfield albums, including After the Gold Rush, Harvest, Everybody Knows This Is Nowhere, On the Beach, Buffalo Springfield and Buffalo Springfield Again.

Additionally, the album features the only known recording of Young performing his song "Cinnamon Girl" on piano. As stated by his comment on the disc "That's the first time I've ever performed that song on piano!"

The album closes with "Flying on the Ground is Wrong" in which Young quips: "I had it put in my contracts that I would only play on a nine-foot Steinway grand piano, just for a little eccentricity."

Track listing

Personnel
Neil Young – vocal (all), acoustic guitar (1-2, 5-6, 7, 11-12), piano (3-4, 7, 9-10, 13)
Recorded at The Cellar Door, Washington, DC on November 30, 1970 (1-7); December 1, 1970 (8-9); December 2, 1970 (10-13)
Produced by: Neil Young
Recorded by: Henry Lewy  
Mixed by: John Nowland and Tim Mulligan at Redwood Digital, Redwood City CA
Analog to Digital Transfers by John Nowland at His Master's Wheels, Woodside, CA
Mastering by Tim Mulligan at Redwood Digital, Redwood City CA

Charts

Year-end charts

References

Neil Young live albums
2013 live albums
Reprise Records live albums